Iraqi Republic may refer to:
The Republic of Iraq, a country in the Middle East
Iraqi Republic (1958–68), a former state that existed from 1958 to 1968
Ba'athist Iraq, formally the "Iraqi Republic", existed from 1968 to 2003